Ocean Monarch was a  cruise ship which was built by Vickers-Armstrongs in 1950. She served with Furness Bermuda Line for fifteen years, then with a Bulgarian company for three years, renamed Varna. She spent much of the 1970s laid up, and was renamed Venus and then Riviera. In the early 1980s, she was renamed Reina del Mar and refitted for further use as a cruise ship, but a fire gutted her; and she was scuttled on 1 June 1981 after another fire broke out.

History
Ocean Monarch was built by Vickers-Armstrongs Ltd, Walker, at a cost of £2,500,000. She was yard number 119, and was launched on 27 July 1950, with completion in March 1951. She was the first postwar-built ship designed especially for the American cruise market. Accommodations were for 414 first class passengers only. Ocean Monarch was awarded a gold medal by the American Institute for Designing for her "outstanding beauty and unusual design features of a cruise ship".

Ocean Monarch was used on the New York - Bermuda route. As well as conveying passengers she was used to supply fresh drinking water to the island. She served with Furness Withy via subsidiary Furness Bermuda Line until 1966. On 22 September she was laid up in the  River Fal, Cornwall.

In 1967, she was sold to Navigation Maritime Bulgare and renamed Varna. Operated by Balkantourist, Varna, She was used on cruises from Montreal, Quebec, Canada. Varna was laid up in 1970 at Perama, Greece. In 1973, Varna was chartered by Sovereign Cruises, but only made two voyages with them. She was then laid up again. Her name was changed to Venus in 1977, and  Riviera in 1978. in 1979, she was refurbished for use by Trans-Tirreno Express.

She was chartered by SUR-Seereisen, Germany, who announced a series of Mediterranean cruises to take place in summer 1981. Her name was changed to Reina del Mar. Before these cruises took place the ship was renovated. On 28 May 1981, a fire broke out which completely gutted the passenger accommodation. The ship was towed out of Ambelakia, where the renovation was being carried out. The tow parted and Reina del Mar ran aground on Salamina Island. After being refloated, she was moored near Rasa Sayang, which had also been gutted by fire. On 1 June 1981, a new fire broke out on Reina del Mar, and she was then scuttled off Kynosoura.

Description and propulsion
The ship had a crew of c250 and carried up to 414 passengers, all 1st class.

References

 Cruising Ships, W.H. Mitchell and L. A. Sawyer, Doubleday 1967

External links
 Poem about Ocean Monarch

Ships built on the River Tyne
1950 ships
Cruise ships
Passenger ships of the United Kingdom
Passenger ships of Bulgaria
Passenger ships of Greece
Ship fires
Maritime incidents in 1981
Shipwrecks in the Mediterranean Sea